UFC 24: First Defense was a mixed martial arts event held by the Ultimate Fighting Championship on March 10, 2000, at the Lake Charles Civic Center in Lake Charles, Louisiana.

History
The event featured the first UFC appearances of Ian Freeman, future UFC Middleweight Champion Dave Menne and Shonie Carter. UFC 24 also featured the first televised appearance of Jens Pulver, who had fought in an untelevised preliminary bout at UFC 22.

The name "First Defense" refers to a scheduled Heavyweight title Bout between Kevin Randleman and Pedro Rizzo, which did not happen due to injury. While warming up backstage during the event, Randleman slipped on the concrete floor and hit his head, knocking himself out completely. Randleman was taken by ambulance to the hospital, where he was revived, and diagnosed with a concussion. As the incident happened during the broadcast, fans in attendance and viewers watching on pay per view were not notified until the end of the show. The bout was rescheduled and took place at UFC 26.

This event also marked the appearance of Dan Severn as a referee for the preliminary bouts. Unlike the traditional solid black garb of a UFC referee, he wore black and white stripes and red shoes.

UFC 24 was initially seen live on pay per view, but was not released on home video at the time. A double DVD with UFC 23 and 24 was released in 2007.

Results

See also 
 Ultimate Fighting Championship
 List of UFC champions
 List of UFC events
 2000 in UFC

External links
Official UFC website

Ultimate Fighting Championship events
2000 in mixed martial arts
Mixed martial arts in Louisiana
Sports in Lake Charles, Louisiana
2000 in sports in Louisiana